HMS Lancaster was an 80-gun third rate ship of the line of the Royal Navy, launched at Bursledon on 3 April 1694.

Early career 
Lancaster was built at a cost of £12,807.4.10d, and had an armament of twenty-four demi-cannon, thirty culverins, and twenty-six sakers: eighty guns in all. She was launched at Bursledon on 3 April 1694 under Captain Andrew Leake, and was commanded by Captain Robert Robinson in 1696 and Henry Martin in 1697. In 1702, under Captain John Price, she was with Cloudesley Shovell and the Mediterranean Fleet, and continued so, commanded by Captain Christopher Myngs in 1703, and under Captain James Moodie from 1707 to 1708. She spent 1708 with Admiral John Leake's fleet in the Straits of Gibraltar, and was probably under Captain John Huntingdon from 1709 to 1711 in the English Channel.

Later career 
She was rebuilt according to the 1719 Establishment at Portsmouth, from where she was relaunched on 1 September 1722. After this time, her armament of 80 guns, previously carried on two gundecks, was carried on three, though she continued to be classified as a third rate. On 15 February 1743 she was ordered to be taken to pieces and rebuilt at Woolwich Dockyard as a 66-gun third rate according to the 1741 proposals of the 1719 Establishment. This rebuild returned her to a two-decker, and she was relaunched on 22 April 1749.

Fate 
Lancaster was broken up in 1773.

Notes

References

Lavery, Brian (2003) The Ship of the Line – Volume 1: The development of the battlefleet 1650–1850. Conway Maritime Press. .

Ships of the line of the Royal Navy
1690s ships
Ships built on the River Hamble